Betsy Ross Arts Magnet School is an interdistrict middle school located at 150 Kimberly Avenue, New Haven, Connecticut, with a focus on the arts.

Students are offered an array of art subjects including music, visual art, dance and theater along with additional disciplines within each subject. While students do partake in arts classes during each school day, academic programs are also an important focus. Betsy Ross has many connections within the New Haven county community including the Quinnipiac University College Scholars Program and a residency with Shubert Theatre (New Haven).

History
 In 1998, the collaboration of sixth grade Betsy Ross dancers and the Pilobolus Dance Theater was featured in the New York Times.
 In 2000, Betsy Ross was one of three schools in Connecticut to participate as an affiliate in the New York Times Learning Network.

References

External links
 Betsy Ross Arts Magnet School homepage

Public middle schools in Connecticut
Schools in New Haven, Connecticut
Magnet schools in Connecticut